Gang Green is a punk rock band from Braintree, Massachusetts.

Gang Green may refer to:

 A nickname for the New York Jets football team.
Professor Gangreen, The main villain in Return of the Killer Tomatoes
The Gangreen Gang, characters in The Powerpuff Girls

See also
Gangrene (disambiguation)